Papaya is a fruit of the plant Carica papaya that is also known as "pawpaw."

Papaya may also refer  to:

Papaya (group), an all-girl pop music group from South Korea
Papaya (singer) or Miss Papaya, stage names of Danish singer and musician Linnéa Handberg Lund
"Papaya" (song), a song by Polish jazz vocalist Urszula Dudziak
Papaya (dance), a popular dance in East Asia danced to the Urszula Dudziak song
Papaya (club), a nightclub on Zrće Beach, Pag Island, Croatia
Papaya Studio, a video game developer
Papaya Suzuki, a Japanese dancer and choreographer
Papaya whip, a pastel color
PapayaMobile, mobile social gaming network also known as Papaya
Papaya is a former name of General Tinio, Nueva Ecija
"Pa Pa Ya!!", a song by Babymetal

See also
Papaya Coconut
Papaya King
Mountain papaya
Asimina another fruit that, like Carica, is called pawpaw
Paw Paw (disambiguation)